The Tivoli Stadion Tirol (formerly named ) is a multi-purpose stadium in Innsbruck, Austria. It is currently used mostly for football matches and is the home ground of Bundesliga club WSG Tirol and Raiders Tirol of the European League of Football. The stadium capacity was 17,400 when it was built in 2000. For the UEFA Euro 2008 the stadium was temporarily expanded to 30,000 people. The North Stand is fitted with rail seats for safe standing.

History

Tivoli-Neu was named after the original Tivoli stadium, which was at a different place next to the Sill River. It was closed down in 2004, four years after Tivoli-Neu was opened.

On May 28, 2010, Spain played an international friendly against Saudi Arabia, winning 3–2.

Euro 2008 Matches

See also
OlympiaWorld Innsbruck

References

External links

FC Wacker Innsbruck
Football venues in Austria
Sport in Innsbruck
Multi-purpose stadiums in Austria
Buildings and structures in Innsbruck
Tourist attractions in Innsbruck
Sports venues in Tyrol (state)
UEFA Euro 2008 stadiums in Austria
Sports venues completed in 2000
American football venues in Austria
2000 establishments in Austria
European League of Football venues
WSG Tirol
FC Wacker Innsbruck (2002)
21st-century architecture in Austria